A Tale of Two Cities is a 1917 American silent historical drama film directed by Frank Lloyd and starring William Farnum, Jewel Carmen, and Charles Clary. The film is based on Charles Dickens' 1859 novel of the same name, which has been filmed a number of times.

Premise
During the French Revolution a British lawyer courageously takes the place of a French aristocrat sentenced to be guillotined.

Cast
 William Farnum as Charles Darnay / Sydney Carton 
 Jewel Carmen as Lucie Manette 
 Charles Clary as Marquis St. Evenmonde 
 Herschel Mayall as Jacques Defarge  
 Rosita Marstini as Madame Therese Defarge  
 Josef Swickard as Dr. Alexandre Manette  
 Ralph Lewis as Roger Cly  
 William Clifford as Gabelle  
 Marc Robbins as Jarvis Lorry 
 Olive White as Miss Pross  
 Willard Louis as Mr. CJ Stryver 
 Harry De Vere as Gaspard  
 Florence Vidor as Mimi

References

Bibliography
 Goble, Alan. The Complete Index to Literary Sources in Film. Walter de Gruyter, 1999.

External links

 
 
 
 

1917 films
American silent feature films
1910s historical drama films
1910s English-language films
Films directed by Frank Lloyd
Fox Film films
Films based on A Tale of Two Cities
Films set in London
Films set in Paris
Films set in the 18th century
American black-and-white films
American historical drama films
1917 drama films
Silent American drama films
1910s American films